Roy Ellis Moran (September 17, 1884 – July 18, 1966), nicknamed "Deedle", was a Major League Baseball left fielder who played for the Washington Senators in .
Married: Modo Moran --
Daughter: Muriel Setters --
Grand Daughter: Betty Kenimer --
Great Grandson: Ronald Curland.

External links

1884 births
1966 deaths
Washington Senators (1901–1960) players
Major League Baseball left fielders
Baseball players from Indiana
People from Vincennes, Indiana
Jacksonville Lunatics players
Atlanta Crackers players
Chattanooga Lookouts players
Sacramento Sacts players
Sacramento Wolves players
Mission Wolves players